Major General Sir William Douglas Smith  (24 March 1865 – 4 February 1939) was a British Army officer who became Lieutenant Governor of Jersey.

Military career
Smith was the son of Lt.-Col. Andrew William Douglas Smith, Royal Marines and Myra Elizabeth Luxmoore, an artist. Smith was commissioned into the Royal Scots Fusiliers in 1885. He took part in the Burma expedition in 1886 and the Tirah Campaign in 1897. He was appointed a Brigade Major in India in 1905 and Commanding Officer of 1 Bn Royal Scots Fusiliers in 1911. He served in World War I as Commander of the 9th Infantry Brigade, as General Officer Commanding 20th (Light) Division and then as General Officer Commanding 56th (1/1st London) Division in France. He took command of the 56th Division on a temporary basis between 24 July 1917 and 9 August 1917 after his predecessor had been taken ill and until a permanent appointment could be made.

After the War he became Commander of Portsmouth Garrison and then Lieutenant Governor of Jersey before retiring in 1924.

Family
He married Kathleen Edith Beyts and had one daughter.

References

|-

1865 births
1939 deaths
British Army major generals
Military personnel from Plymouth, Devon
Knights Commander of the Order of the Bath
Knights Commander of the Royal Victorian Order
Royal Scots Fusiliers officers
Governors of Jersey
British Army generals of World War I
British military personnel of the Third Anglo-Burmese War
British military personnel of the Tirah campaign
People from Stonehouse, Plymouth